De Vrijheid is a name given to some windmills in the Netherlands.

De Vrijheid, Beesd, a tower mill in Gelderland
De Vrijheid, Schiedam, a tower mill in South Holland

See also
Partij voor de Vrijheid, a Dutch political party founded in 2005